In biology, a nymph is the immature form of some invertebrates, particularly insects, which undergoes gradual metamorphosis (hemimetabolism) before reaching its adult stage.  Unlike a typical larva, a nymph's overall form already resembles that of the adult, except for a lack of wings (in winged species). In addition, while a nymph moults, it never enters a pupal stage. Instead, the final moult results in an adult insect. Nymphs undergo multiple stages of development called instars.

This is the case, for example, in Orthoptera (crickets, grasshoppers and locusts), Hemiptera (cicadas, shield bugs, whiteflies, aphids, leafhoppers, froghoppers, treehoppers etc.), mayflies, termites, cockroaches, mantises, stoneflies and Odonata (dragonflies and damselflies).

Nymphs of aquatic insects, as in the Odonata, Ephemeroptera, and Plecoptera, are also called naiads, an Ancient Greek name for mythological water nymphs. Some entomologists have claimed that it the terms larva, nymph and naiad should be used according to the developmental mode classification (hemimetabolous, paurometabolous or holometabolous) but others have pointed out that there is no real confusion. In older literature, these were sometimes referred to as the heterometabolous insects, as their adult and immature stages live in different environments (terrestrial vs. aquatic).

Relationship with humans 
In fly fishing with artificial flies, this stage of aquatic insects is the basis for an entire series of representative patterns for trout. They account for over half of the over all patterns regularly fished in the United States.

See also 
 Naiads in Greek mythology

References

Insect developmental biology